Nakhon Luang is a district (amphoe) in the northeastern part of Ayutthaya province, central Thailand.

History
The district was originally part of Nakhon Luang Noi district (now named Bang Pahan), and was established as a separate district in 1895.

In 1903 the district office was moved into Nakhon Luang Sub-district, and therefore the district was renamed from Nakhon Klang to Nakhon Luang.

Geography
Neighbouring districts are (from the north clockwise) Don Phut of Saraburi province and Tha Ruea, Phachi, Uthai, Phra Nakhon Si Ayutthaya and Bang Pahan of Ayutthaya Province.

Administration

Central administration 
Nakhon Luang is divided into 12 sub-districts (tambon), which are further subdivided into 74 administrative villages (muban).

Local administration 
There are two sub-district municipalities (thesaban tambon) in the district:
 Nakhon Luang consisting of the sub-district Nakhon Luang and parts of the sub-districts Bang Rakam and Bang Phra Khru.
 Aranyik consisting of the sub-districts Tha Chang, Sam Thai, and Phra Non.

There are six sub-district administrative organizations (SAO) in the district:
 Bo Phong consisting of the sub-district Bo Phong.
 Ban Chung consisting of the sub-district Ban Chung.
 Pak Chan consisting of the sub-district Pak Chan.
 Mae La consisting of the sub-district Mae La and parts of sub-districts Bang Rakam and Bang Phra Khru.
 Nong Pling consisting of the sub-district Nong Pling.
 Khlong Sakae consisting of the sub-district Khlong Sakae.

References

External links
amphoe.com (Thai)

Nakhon Luang